In geometry, a truncated icosidodecahedral prism or great rhombicosidodecahedral prism is a convex uniform 4-polytope (four-dimensional polytope).

It is one of 18 convex uniform polyhedral prisms created by using uniform prisms to connect pairs of Platonic solids or Archimedean solids in parallel hyperplanes.

Alternative names 
 Truncated icosidodecahedral dyadic prism (Norman W. Johnson) 
 Griddip (Jonathan Bowers: for great rhombicosidodecahedral prism/hyperprism) 
 Great rhombicosidodecahedral prism/hyperprism

Related polytopes 
It has 184 cells: 2 snub dodecahedrons connected by 30 tetrahedrons, 12 pentagonal antiprisms, and 20 octahedrons, with 120 tetrahedrons in the alternated gaps. It has 120 vertices, 480 edges, and 544 faces (24 pentagons and 40+480 triangles). It has [5,3,2]+ symmetry, order 120.

Vertex figure for the omnisnub dodecahedral antiprism

External links 
 
 

4-polytopes